Seven referendums were held in Switzerland during 1995. The first four were held on 12 March on a federal resolution on the popular initiative "for an environmentally sound and efficient peasant farming" (rejected), on a resolution on dairy farming (rejected), an amendment to the farming law (rejected) and a federal resolution on spending (approved).

The last three were held on 25 June on an amendment to the federal law on aged and bereaved insurance (approved), a popular initiative to extend aged and bereaved and invalidity insurance (rejected) and an amendment to the federal law on purchasing land through agents abroad (rejected).

Results

References

1995 elections in Switzerland
1995 referendums
Referendums in Switzerland